Sultan Saeed Abdullah al-Barakani  (born 1956) is a Yemeni politician and the current speaker of the Yemeni House of Representatives since 2019.

Al-Barakani was born in 1956 in Al-Maafer District, Taiz Governorate. He is a GPC MP, and was elected as new speaker of the House of Representatives during a session held in Seiyun on 13 April 2019. This was the first session for the parliament loyal to the internationally recognized government of Yemen since the Yemen civil war started in 2015.

References 

Living people
Speakers of the House of Representatives (Yemen)
Yemeni politicians
People from Taiz Governorate
General People's Congress (Yemen) politicians
1956 births